The Spirit Cabinet is a novel by Paul Quarrington about two oddball Las Vegas magicians. It was first published by Random House of Canada in 1999.

Notes

1999 Canadian novels
Novels by Paul Quarrington